Berchemia scandens, commonly called Alabama supplejack, is a species of climbing plant in the buckthorn family. It is native to the central and southern parts of the United States. It is found in a wide variety of habitats, including swamps, bottomlands, riparian banks, and upland calcareous areas.

It is a woody vine, with older stems reaching 18 cm in diameter. The strong stems of the plant are often used for wickerwork.  It produces flowers in the spring

Traditional medicinal uses
The Houma people used a decoction of the aerial parts of the vine for impotency. Other Native Americans used the plant as a blood purifier and the ashes of the vine to treat coughs.

References

scandens
Flora of the Southeastern United States
Flora of the Southern United States
Flora without expected TNC conservation status